Heinz Günthardt and Balázs Taróczy were the defending champions, but lost in the semifinals this year.

Tim Gullikson and Tom Gullikson won the title, defeating Kevin Curren and Steve Denton 6–4, 6–7, 7–6 in the final.

Seeds

  Mark Edmondson /  Sherwood Stewart (quarterfinals)
  Anders Järryd /  Hans Simonsson (semifinals)
  Tim Gullikson /  Tom Gullikson (champions)
  Pavel Složil /  Tomáš Šmíd (quarterfinals)

Draw

Draw

References
Draw

1984 Grand Prix (tennis)
Donnay Indoor Championships